Lozovoye is the name of several inhabited localities:
Lozovoye, Belogorsky District, Amur Oblast, a selo in Kustanayevsky Selsoviet of Belogorsky District, Amur Oblast
Lozovoye, Tambovsky District, Amur Oblast, a selo in Sadovsky Selsoviet of Tambovsky District, Amur Oblast
Lozovoye, Voronezh Oblast
Lozovoye, Rovensky District, Belgorod Oblast
Lozovoe (Pavlodar Region), Kazakhstan